This list comprises all players who have participated in at least one league match for Fort Wayne Fever since the team's first season in the USL in 2003. Players who were on the roster but never played a first team game are not listed; players who appeared for the team in other competitions (US Open Cup, etc.) but never actually made an USL appearance are noted at the bottom of the page where appropriate.

A
  Rique Addae
  Mehmet Ali
  Gabriel Arredondo
  Matt Avellino
  Dustin Awe
  Michael Azira

B
  Gregory Badger
  William Bagayoko
  Richard Balchan
  David Bauer
  Justin Bigelow
  Jonathan Bilinski
  Phil Boerger
  Misiko Bonivenger
  Terry Boss
  Gary Boughton
  Jamie Bowman
  Daniel Broxup
  Garrett Buck
  Salim Bullen

C
  Jacob Capito
  Daniel Chilton
  Marcus Chorvat
  Gavin Chura
  Adam Ciklic
  Joe Connor
  Lee Crawford

D
  Justin Darvich
  Keith Detelj
  Paul Dolinsky
  Kyle Dulworth

E
  Cory Elenio
  Adam Eurch
  Austin Evans

F
  Britton Falkenstern
  Mitch Falkenstern
  Jean-Yves Fankam

G
  Zac Gibbens
  Jared Gillespie
  Jordan Gillespie
  Cesar Gonzalez-Olvera
  Qian Grosvenor

H
  Kegan Harkenrider
  Benjamin Harner
  John Michael Hayden
  Matthew Hedges
  Matt Hein
  Joseph Held
  Harrison Heller
  Brent Helton
  Marvin Hong

J
  David James
  Omar Jarun
  Andy Johnson
  Chase Jones
  Cameron Jordan

K
  Jeffrey Kellogg
  Justin Kirk
  Michael Knitter
  Cody Kother

L
  Adrian l'Esperance
  Christian Lopez-Peralta
  Brian Lux
  Robert Lynch

M
  David Maddren
  Thomas Mangotic
  John Mariscalco
  Raphael Martinez
  Jasno Mason
  Tyler McCarroll
  Wayne McCarron
  Trey Meek
  Joshua Meier
  John Mellencamp
  Lance Muckey
  Eddie Munnelly
  Christopher Munroe
  Michael Munroe
  Yahaya Musa
  Byram Muteshi

N
  Vangel Nacovski
  George Nanchoff
  Oscar Narvaez
  Jarrett Neff
  Edward Noschang

O
  Erick Odour
  Patrick O'Driscoll
  Jeremy Ortiz
  Pawel Otachel

P
  Mike Palacio
  Chas Parry
  Frank Peabody
  Richard Pearce
  Trevor Peaslee
  Michael Porter
  Christian Porto
  Nick Potter
  Matthew Pranger
  Phil Presser
  Mark Prosser

Q
  Liridon Qafleshi
  Gerardo Quiroz-Gardona

R
  Rudy Ramirez
  Jamal Robinson
  Dominique Jordan Romero

S
  Kyle Schwartz
  Josh Scott
  Jesse Sharp
  Dennis Sharpe
  Andrew Shinabarger
  Josh Sommers
  Wyatt Sorg
  Michael Spencer
  Tye Stebbins
  Greg Sterning
  Ben Stevens
  Matt Sulkin
  Jeff Suzuki
  Aaron Swanson

T
  Solomon Taiwo
  Max Touloute
  Matthew Troop
  Josh Tudela
  Aaron Tulloch

U
  Michael Umelo

V
  Joey Vitagliano

W
  Michael Walbridge
  Christopher Walker
  Victor Webb
  Mark Weigand
  Frederick Were
  Nick Wilson
  Philip Wilson
  Tim Wylie

Y
  Patrick Yates

Sources

Fort Wayne Fever
 
Association football player non-biographical articles